Caught is a Canadian crime drama television series, which debuted on CBC Television on February 26, 2018 written and produced by Allan Hawco. Based on the 2014 novel by Lisa Moore, Caught is about a drug dealer who, with the help of a corrupt cop, makes a daring jailbreak from a New Brunswick prison in 1978, and travels across the globe to hunt down his drug king-pin ex-partner.

Allan Hawco (Republic of Doyle) was presented with the story by eOne's Tecca Crosby (SVP, Scripted Development) and was eager to take on the project due to its rich story and characters. The series was produced by Take The Shot with CBC in Canada, with distribution handled by eOne.

Cast
Allan Hawco as David Slaney: a drug dealer who escapes from prison in 1978 to undertake another heist
Paul Gross as Roy Patterson: an alcoholic renegade detective
Eric Johnson as Brian Hearn: Slaney's former partner in crime
Tori Anderson as Ada
Enuka Okuma as KC Williams
Greg Bryk as Cyril Carter

Episodes

References

External links

CBC Television original programming
2018 Canadian television series debuts
2010s Canadian crime drama television series
Television shows based on Canadian novels